Domingo Rivas (29 March 1933 – 29 August 2020) was a Venezuelan racing cyclist. He competed in the three events at the 1956 Summer Olympics.

References

External links
 

1933 births
2020 deaths
Venezuelan male cyclists
Olympic cyclists of Venezuela
Cyclists at the 1956 Summer Olympics
Place of birth missing
20th-century Venezuelan people